Stefano Domenicali (born 11 May 1965) is an Italian manager and the current CEO of Formula One Group, replacing Chase Carey. He was the CEO of Italian sports car manufacturer Lamborghini from 2016 to 2020. He was the team principal of the Scuderia Ferrari Formula One team. Under his leadership Ferrari won their last Formula One World Championship to date.

Early life
Domenicali was born in Imola, the son of a banker. As a child, he used to go to the Autodromo Enzo e Dino Ferrari race track at weekends to help out in the paddock and in the media centre – an experience that piqued his interest in motor racing.

Career
Domenicali studied business administration at University of Bologna, graduating in 1991. Upon graduation he joined Ferrari where he worked in the finance department. Between 1992 and 1994, he was race director at Mugello and was involved in DTM and other racing series. In 1995 he was appointed head of personnel in Ferrari's sporting department and was involved with sponsorship liaison, before being promoted to Team Manager in December 1996.

He remained there until January 2001. After a brief stint as Logistics Manager, he became the team's Sporting Director in 2002.
On 12 November 2007 Ferrari announced Domenicali would take on the role of Director of the Ferrari Formula One team, a position previously held by Jean Todt, and became team principal in 2008. Under his leadership, Ferrari won the 2008 Constructors' Championship, before enduring a less competitive  season in which the team won only a single race. In , the team won five races and finished third in the Constructors' Championship, behind Red Bull Racing and McLaren. Domenicali led the team into , which saw Fernando Alonso finish fourth in the championship table, two places ahead of Felipe Massa in sixth. Then came the 2012 season, which saw Fernando Alonso just missing out on the title; a result masked by his outstanding performance, since his teammate was 156 points behind him.
He and Ferrari claimed three Grand Prix victories and placed second in both the Drivers' and Constructors' Championships. He was named one of "The Men of the Year 2012" by Top Gear magazine for keeping Ferrari at sharp end of F1, against the odds. Domenicali resigned as Ferrari team principal in April 2014.

In October 2014, Domenicali was hired by Audi. He was also appointed as head of the FIA's Single-Seater Commission. On 15 March 2016 he was appointed CEO at Automobili Lamborghini S.p.A. He was replaced by Stephan Winkelmann on 1 December 2020.

In September 2020, it was announced that Domenicali would replace Chase Carey as CEO of Formula One Group from the 2021 season.

Domenicali has also defended F1 using Qatar and Saudi Arabia for F1 races, after he was criticised. There has been widespread criticisim over the use of slave labour in the Gulf countries.

References

1965 births
Living people
Audi people
Ferrari people
Formula One team principals
Italian motorsport people
Italian sports directors
Lamborghini people
People from Imola